"Chow Down (at Chick-fil-A)" is a song by American singer and drag queen Willam Belli, featuring Detox and Vicky Vox (known collectively as DWV). The song was released on March 18, 2012, following Willam's elimination from the fourth season of RuPaul's Drag Race. Upon release, the song's music video went viral online.

Background and composition

"Chow Down (at Chick-fil-A)" was written by Willam Belli, Detox, and Vicky Vox as a parody of "Hold On" by Wilson Phillips. The song was produced by Markaholic.  It also features a rap by Detox as an homage to "Waterfalls" by TLC.  The song was released as the second single from Willam's first studio album The Wreckoning. "Chow Down" addresses the 2012 Chick-fil-A same-sex marriage controversy and the opening of a Chick-fil-A restaurant in Hollywood.

Reception
Within three days of its release, the YouTube page for the music video had been viewed over 400,000 times.

Hugh Merwin, writing for New Yorks Grub Street commented, "It's amazing how oddly and efficiently the drag queen trio in this video approach the notoriously anti-gay, foundational agenda of the Georgia-based fried chicken franchise Chick-fil-A in this video."

Music video
The music video for "Chow Down (at Chick-fil-A)" was directed by Michael Serrato. Serrato is a writer for the Neil's Puppet Dreams, in which Willam has appeared. RuPaul's Drag Race pit crew member Jason Carter appears in the music video. In the music video, Willam dresses as Wilson Phillips member Chynna Phillips, Detox dresses as Wendy Wilson, while Vicky Vox appears as Carnie Wilson.  The music video's rap scene was filmed at the Electric Fountain in Beverly Hills.

Upon release, the music video went viral online.

Charts

References

2012 singles
Chick-fil-A
Comedy songs
LGBT-related songs
Willam Belli songs
Viral videos
2012 YouTube videos